Max von Sydow was a Swedish-French actor who starred in numerous of Ingmar Bergman's films as well as many American films in his 70 year career. He appeared in eleven of Bergman's film including The Seventh Seal (1957), Wild Strawberries (1957), The Magician (1958), The Virgin Spring (1960), Through a Glass Darkly (1961), Winter Light (1963), Shame (1968), The Passion of Anna (1969) and The Touch (1971).

Sydow was able to transfer to American films starring as Jesus Christ in George Stevens' biblical epic film The Greatest Story Ever Told (1965). He later would go on to star in films such as William Friedkin's The Exorcist (1973), David Lynch's Dune (1984), Woody Allen's Hannah and Her Sisters (1986), Penny Marshall's Awakenings (1990), Steven Spielberg's Minority Report (2002), Julian Schnabel's The Diving Bell and the Butterfly (2007), Martin Scorsese's Shutter Island (2010), Ridley Scott's Robin Hood (2010), and J. J. Abrams' Star Wars: The Force Awakens (2015). He also had a supporting role in HBO's Game of Thrones as the Three-eyed Raven, for which he received a Primetime Emmy Award nomination.

He has been nominated for two Academy Awards for his performances in Bille August's Pelle the Conqueror (1987) and  Stephen Daldry's Extremely Loud & Incredibly Close (2011). At the age of 82, von Sydow was one of the oldest nominees for an Academy Award. Sydow also received two Golden Globe Awards nominations as well as two Primetime Emmy Awards nominations. In 1982 he received the Best Actor prize at the Venice International Film Festival for his performance in Flight of the Eagle. He is also the winner of 3 Guldbagge Awards and received a festival trophy from the Cannes Film Festival in 2004. He received the Royal Foundation of Sweden's Cultural Award in 1954, was made a Commandeur des Arts et des Lettres in 2005, and was named a Chevalier de la Légion d'honneur on 17 October 2012.

Major Awards

Academy Award 

At the age of 82, von Sydow was one of the oldest nominees for an Academy Award in the Best Supporting Actor category (for the 2011 film Extremely Loud & Incredibly Close).

Golden Globe Award

Guldbagge Award

Primetime Emmy Award

Film festivals

Critics awards

Other awards

References 

Lists of awards received by French actor